Joyrider may refer to:
Joyride (crime), a crime involving stealing cars
Joyrider (band), a rock band from Portadown, Northern Ireland
The Joyriders, a 1999 American crime drama film
"Joyrider", a 1999 song by Colour Girl